Neil Tolkin is a Canadian screenwriter and film director from Montreal. He attended Westmount High School and Dawson College and McGill University.

Career 
He is best known for contributing to comedies, such as License to Drive with Corey Haim and Corey Feldman, Ri¢hie Ri¢h with Macualy Culkin and Jury Duty with Pauly Shore. He's also written dramas such as the screenplay for the film The Emperor's Club (2002), and an early draft for the World War Two film, Unbroken, to be originally directed by Antoine Fuqua. The film was rewritten and later finally directed by Angelina Jolie.

He also wrote and directed the drama Sticks and Stones in 1996.

Filmography 
 Unbroken (2015) (uncredited) 
 The Emperor's Club (2002) 
 Sticks and Stones (1996) 
 Jury Duty (1995) 
 Ri¢hie Ri¢h (1994) 
 License to Drive (1988)

References

External links

Canadian male screenwriters
Living people
Year of birth missing (living people)
Dawson College alumni
McGill University alumni
20th-century Canadian screenwriters
20th-century Canadian male writers
21st-century Canadian screenwriters
21st-century Canadian male writers